The Oatlands District Football Association (ODFA) is a non-professional Australian rules football league located in Tasmania, Australia.

Oatlands District Football Association origins: 1952–1999

On Monday 24 March 1952 a meeting was held at the Parattah Hotel, with the aim being to form a local football competition, the meeting was attended by representatives from Tunbridge, Woodsdale and Parattah.
When the competition was formed it aimed to give players of the Oatlands Municipality, who could not be absorbed into the Midlands Football Association, an opportunity to play football.
The three clubs affiliated with the Oatlands District Football Competition, and football commenced on 19 April 1952, with Woodsdale defeating Parattah 3.7 (25) to 2.3 (15).
Parattah's coach for the first season was Max Kelly, Tunbridge had Ken Gourlay in charge, and Cyril Payne was the first ever coach of Woodsdale.
Tunbridge had the distinction of winning the first premiership.
Mr Ron Rowlands of Woodsdale donated the first shield, which was to be retained by the club gaining the most match points at the end of three years, it was appropriately won by Woodsdale in 1954 with 138 points, although they had not yet won a premiership.
The late Max Fergusson of Parattah was the first President/Chairman of the competition, and the first Secretary/Treasurer was the late Alan Payne of Woodsdale.
In 1953, Mt.Pleasant affiliated, making an even number of teams in the competition.

The Association did not affiliate with any parent body until 1955, when it affiliated with the Tasmanian Football League.
In sympathy with a number of other country football associations, and because it believed it was right thing to do, the Association became unaffiliated and joined the Southern Tasmanian Country Football Council in 1960.
The ODFA re-affiliated with the TFL in 1971 and remained so until the TFL collapsed after the 2000 season.

In 1955, it was decided to change the name of the body to the Oatlands District Football Association.
The first lightning premiership was conducted by the Association in 1955 at Parattah, resulting in a draw between Woodsdale and Tunbridge, each scoring 4.2 (26).
The first tribunal meeting was held on the 19 August 1952 after an umpires' report was lodged with Max Burns of Parattah and Clyde Hart of Tunbridge found guilty of striking each other and were stood down for two roster matches.

The Association decided in 1956 the teams in the Association field 16 players a side, and this policy was retained until 1977, when it was increased to eighteen players and two interchange players.
In 1957 the late Mr H.M Jones was elected President/Chairman, and in the same year, the late Ron Bean of Tunbridge was elected Secretary/Treasurer, a position he held for 30 years, Ron had attended all but two meetings of the Association between 1953 and 1977.
In recognition of Mr Bean's service to the Association he was made a Life Member in 1971.  The late Mr H.M Jones donated the second shield in 1955, which was to be won by the team winning 3 titles since then, this was won by Woodsdale in 1959.
It was decided in 1959 that the premiership team in the Association be presented with a pennant, a practice the Association continues to this day.
In 1992, the ODFA decided it would provide medallions for the players of the Premiership teams.
In 1970, discussions commenced between the Midlands Football Association, which consisted of  Oatlands, Tunnack, Ross and Campbell Town, and the ODFA with regards to the possibility of a merger because of dwindling population from country areas.
These discussions did not come to any definite arrangements, and the Midlands Football Association went into recess in 1971.

The ODFA remained unchanged until 1974, when Kempton and Colebrook were admitted to the Association, both previously from the South Eastern District Football Association, making six teams.
William Dunbabin became the second life member of the Association, as Mr Dunbabin served many years as President/Chairman of the Association.
The following year, Ray Johnson and Jeff Doddridge were made Life Members, and Colebrook won the flag, their one and only.
In 1978, Association name-sake team Oatlands was admitted, the first team from the old Midlands Football Association, at the end of 1978, Colebrook went into recess, the first club to go into recess at the time.
In 1980, ex-Midlands Football Association clubs Ross and Tunnack were admitted, making eight teams, until January 1982, when original club Tunbridge went into recess.

In 1986, Lou Bisdee was made the fifth Life Member of the Association. In the same year, the ODFA gained its first sponsorship, from Tasmanian Breweries (Cascade for the Association and affiliated clubs).
In 1987, the late Ron Bean retired from the position of Secretary/Treasurer, after 30 years to the Association, Ian McElwee of Kempton was appointed Secretary, and Gwenda Cowle of Buckland was appointed Treasurer.
In the same year, the Parattah Football Club went into recess, and Bothwell was admitted to the Association, from the Southern Tasmanian Football Association (not related to the STFA that became the TFL).

In 1988, Ian McElwee resigned as Secretary, and Helen Scott of Woodsdale was appointed Secretary – Mrs Scott is the daughter of the late Ron Bean.
The year 1988 was two more firsts for the Association – the commencement of the Reserves Football Competition, following increased pressure from Kempton, as they had far too many players for only one side.
This caused friction for extremely rural clubs, Mount Pleasant and Woodsdale, and at times Ross, due to the fact that attracting 60 players to the club can prove difficult.
The year 1994 almost saw the end of the reserves, as the three above clubs didn't field reserves sides.
The other first for 1988 was the commencement of the Annual End of Season Dinner and Trophy Presentation, which were held at a variety of locations.
In 1989, Colebrook was re-admitted to the Association, again making it an eight team competition.

On 6 October 1990, Ron Rowlands of Woodsdale was made the sixth Life Member of the Association.
In the same year, the ODFA Secretary completed the work necessary for the Association to become an Incorporated Association.
In 1991, the TANFL Umpires Association pulled the pin on sending umpires to the ODFA (and Tasman Football Association), in turn, the ODFA formed its own Umpires Association, which affiliated with the TFL, and was recognised by the AFL.
In Round 2 1993, Woodsdale kicked 77.29 (491) to Colebrook's 0.1 (1) which still stands as a Tasmanian record score.

On 30 September 1994, Owen Davis, formerly of Ross, then living in Launceston was made the seventh Life Member of the Association.
In January 1995, the Colebrook Football Club went into recess, leaving a seven-team competition, with all clubs fielding reserves.
In 1996 due to the declining number of umpires, the Association disbanded its Umpiring Association, and umpires were sought from the Southern Umpires Association.

In 1998 it became compulsory for clubs wishing to affiliate with the ODFA to field both a Senior and Reserves team, with strict rules pertaining to forfeiture of matches being implemented.  On 10 October 1998, at its Annual General Meeting, both Helen Scott and Gwenda Cowle were made Life Members of the Association with the special guest on the night being the late Premier of Tasmania, the Honorable Jim Bacon MHA.
After 1999, the Association saw numerous seasons of chopping and changing teams due to the harsh economic realities of life in country regions, Woodsdale, Ross and Tunnack dropped out.

Summer of 2005–2006

The biggest change came at the end of the 2005 season when Oatlands, Kempton and Bothwell decided to resign from the ODFA, merge with each other and joined the SFL Regional League as the Central Hawks from 2006. Triabunna, which had joined the Association in 2002 from the now defunct Tasman Football Association, also moved to the SFL.

This left only Mount Pleasant and Swansea before Woodsdale and Ross reformed – Woodsdale had previously went into recess from the Association a few years earlier because of their inability to field a reserve side, however there is currently no reserve grade competition.

2007–2013 Competition expands
2007 saw Campania Football Club be reformed and join the ODFA making the association a 5-team competition.

During the 2008 season, Ross were expelled from the association due to disciplinary problems involving the club.

In 2009 the competition saw the addition of former NTFA Division Two club Campbell Town to replace Ross. At the end of 2010 a group of football supporters formed the Tasman Peninsula Football Club which entered the competition in 2011 season. Even though they did not win a game they came close on several occasions and drew with Woodsdale at Nubeena.

In September 2012 Bothwell split from its merger of the Central Hawks. As a club spokesman said There has only been two games a season in Bothwell. We had sort of lost the community aspect of the club so it was decided last September the club would try to re-form. This ignored the fact that 2 games were moved after the local council closed the ground after bad weather, something not controlled by the Central 
Hawks

Current clubs

Current coaches
Mount Pleasant Football Club – Jordan Byers
Triabunna Football Club – Paul Rainbird
Woodsdale Football Club –  Will Byers
Campania Football Club – Adam Daft
Campbell Town Football Club – Clinton Burn
Bothwell Football Club - Matthew Bird
Oatlands Football Club - Greg Dare

Former clubs
1952–1981 – Tunbridge Football Club.
1952–1986 – Parattah Football Club.
1974–1978 & 1989–1994 – Colebrook Football Club.
1974–2003 – Kempton Football Club.
1980–2000 & 2006–2008 – Ross Football Club.
1980–2001 – Tunnack Football Club.
2011–2017 – Tasman Peninsula Football Club.

ODFA Best and Fairest Medal Winners
1954 – Roy Webb (Woodsdale)
1955 – Len Kline (Woodsdale)
1956 – Kevin Bowerman (Tunbridge)
1957 – Gordon Groves (Parattah)
1958 – David Carnes (Tunbridge)
1959 – Geoff White (Tunbridge)
1960 – Ross Saville (Parattah)
1961 – Ritchie Dransfield (Tunbridge) & Kevin Bailey (Parattah)
1962 – Roger Barwick (Mount Pleasant)
1963 – Roger Barwick (Mount Pleasant)
1964 – Keith Carnes (Mount Pleasant)
1965 – Leo Graham (Woodsdale)
1966 – John Fitzallen (Tunbridge)
1967 – Kevin Bailey (Parattah)
1968 – Roger Dean (Woodsdale)
1969 – Noel Siely (Tunbridge)
1970 – Noel Siely (Tunbridge)
1971 – Sam Foster (Parattah)
1972 – Roger Barwick (Mount Pleasant)
1973 – Neville Barwick (Mount Pleasant)
1974 – William Webster (Tunbridge)
1975 – Ned Toomey (Tunbridge)
1976 – Ned Toomey (Tunbridge)
1977 – Harry Williams (Kempton)
1978 – Len Kamerach (Parattah)
1979 – Michael Lang (Kempton)
1980 – Gavin Roberts (Tunnack)
1981 – Anthony Green (Oatlands)
1982 – Gavin Roberts (Tunnack)
1983 – Gavin Roberts (Tunnack)
1984 – Mark Travers (Woodsdale)
1985 – Mark Travers (Woodsdale)
1986 – Michael Mason (Woodsdale)
1987 – Ned Toomey (Ross)
1988 – Peter Thorpe (Ross)
1989 – Kevin Watson (Woodsdale)
1990 – Peter Thorpe (Ross)
1991 – John Saunders (Bothwell)
1992 – Wayne Hogan (Colebrook)
1993 – Gavin Roberts (Tunnack)
1994 – Peter Thorpe (Ross)
1995 – Andrew Scott (Woodsdale)
1996 – Peter Thorpe (Tunnack)
1997 – Paul Byers (Mount Pleasant)
1998 – Roger Belcher (Mount Pleasant)
1999 – Jarrod Oates (Tunnack)
2000 – Rodney Cowle (Woodsdale)
2001 – Leigh Taylor (Triabunna)
2002 – Nathan Barwick (Mt Pleasant), Luke Goodsell (Oatlands) & Gavin Branch (Bothwell) in 3-way tie
2003 – Damien Triffitt (Bothwell)
2004 – Tim Blanden (Swansea)
2005 – Scott Brazendale (Bothwell)
2006 – Jamie Robson (Mt Pleasant)
2007 – Daniel Davis (Woodsdale)
2008 – Rodney Cowle (Woodsdale)
2009 – Tim Gordon (Swansea) and Trent Wiggins (Woodsdale) in a tie
2010 – Trent Graham (Woodsdale)
2011 – Nathan Barwick (Mt Pleasant)
2012 – Nathan Ross (Woodsdale)
2013 – Sam Hills (Swansea)
2014 – Scott Bone (Mt Pleasant)
2015 – Simon Bryant (Bothwell)
2016 – Alex Downie (Campbell Town)
2017 – Alex Langridge (Campbell Town)
2018 – Jarrod Kaye (Triabunna)
2019 – Matthew Triffett (Campania)

ODFA Grand Finals: 1952–2021
1952 – Tunbridge 16.6 (102) d Parattah 9.8 (62) – Parattah Oval.
1953 – Mount Pleasant 9.17 (71) d Tunbridge 7.5 (47) – Parattah Oval.
1954 – Mount Pleasant 9.7 (61) d Woodsdale 8.10 (58) – Parattah Oval.
1955 – Mount Pleasant 18.24 (132) d Parattah 7.12 (54) – Tunbridge Oval.
1956 – Woodsdale 12.6 (78) d Mount Pleasant 6.8 (44) – Parattah Oval.
1957 – Woodsdale 8.8 (56) d Tunbridge 1.7 (13) – Parattah Oval.
1958 – Tunbridge 16.18 (114) d Woodsdale 11.4 (70) – Parattah Oval.
1959 – Woodsdale 10.15 (75) d Tunbridge 4.10 (34) – Parattah Oval.
1960 – Woodsdale 6.12 (48) d Parattah 3.8 (26) – Parattah Oval.
1961 – Parattah 8.14 (62) d Mount Pleasant 6.11 (47) – Tunbridge Oval.
1962 – Parattah 13.17 (95) d Woodsdale 9.14 (68) – Tunbridge Oval.
1963 – Woodsdale 12.15 (87) dw Mount Pleasant 12.15 (87) – Parattah Oval. (Drawn Final)
1963 – Woodsdale 14.14 (98) d Mount Pleasant 13.7 (85) – Parattah Oval. (Replay)
1964 – Mount Pleasant 12.10 (82) d Woodsdale 10.9 (69) - Parattah Oval.
1965 – Parattah 20.18 (138) d Woodsdale 16.8 (104) – Parattah Oval.
1966 – Tunbridge 11.15 (81) d Woodsdale 8.11 (59) – Parattah Oval.
1967 – Woodsdale 16.21 (117) d Mount Pleasant 10.12 (72) – Parattah Oval.
1968 – Tunbridge 10.9 (69) d Parattah 7.13 (55) – Pawtella Football Ground.
1969 – Parattah 15.19 (109) d Tunbridge 10.13 (73) – Pawtella Football Ground.
1970 – Tunbridge 10.9 (69) d Mount Pleasant 7.13 (55) – Parattah Oval.
1971 – Mount Pleasant 18.18 (126) d Tunbridge 14.13 (97) – Parattah Oval.
1972 – Mount Pleasant 18.21 (129) d Woodsdale 14.15 (99) – Tunbridge Oval.
1973 – Mount Pleasant 20.22 (142) d Tunbridge 10.12 (72) – Parattah Oval.
1974 – Mount Pleasant 19.25 (139) d Parattah 6.11 (47) – Kempton Oval.
1975 – Colebrook 12.25 (97) d Mount Pleasant 8.13 (61) – Tunbridge Oval.
1976 – Kempton 15.15 (105) d Mount Pleasant 14.10 (94) – Colebrook Oval.
1977 – Mount Pleasant 18.20 (128) d Kempton 12.5 (77) – Colebrook Oval.
1978 – Oatlands 11.17 (83) d Mount Pleasant 6.11 (47) – Parattah Oval.
1979 – Mount Pleasant 16.16 (112) d Oatlands 9.12 (66) – Oatlands Oval.
1980 – Mount Pleasant 10.14 (74) d Oatlands 8.16 (64) – Oatlands Oval.
1981 – Oatlands 15.13 (103) d Mount Pleasant 14.10 (94) – Oatlands Oval.
1982 – Kempton 16.8 (104) d Oatlands 11.15 (81) – Oatlands Oval.
1983 – Oatlands 12.11 (83) d Ross 10.10 (70) – Oatlands Oval.
1984 – Oatlands 12.15 (87) d Mount Pleasant 11.13 (79) – Oatlands Oval.
1985 – Ross 11.19 (85) d Mount Pleasant 9.10 (64) – Oatlands Oval.
1986 – Woodsdale 10.12 (72) d Tunnack 8.12 (60) – Oatlands Oval.
1987 – Mount Pleasant 14.13 (97) d Kempton 12.16 (88) – Oatlands Oval.
1988 – Oatlands 11.15 (81) d Kempton 7.17 (59) – Oatlands Oval.
1989 – Bothwell 15.8 (98) d Woodsdale 12.8 (80) – Oatlands Oval.
1990 – Woodsdale 12.6 (78) d Oatlands 8.4 (52) – Oatlands Oval.
1991 – Woodsdale 17.13 (115) d Ross 11.9 (75) – Oatlands Oval.
1992 – Woodsdale 22.11 (143) d Oatlands 11.6 (72) – Oatlands Oval.
1993 – Woodsdale 21.13 (139) d Kempton 11.14 (80) – Oatlands Oval.
1994 – Kempton 24.15 (159) d Woodsdale 11.7 (73) – Oatlands Oval.
1995 – Woodsdale 18.19 (127) d Oatlands 5.11 (41) – Oatlands Oval.
1996 – Woodsdale 14.11 (95) d Kempton 12.10 (82) – Oatlands Oval.
1997 – Bothwell 15.16 (106) d Woodsdale 12.9 (81) – Oatlands Oval.
1998 – Woodsdale 31.16 (202) d Ross 12.17 (89) – Oatlands Oval.
1999 – Woodsdale 12.17 (89) d Mount Pleasant 4.4 (28) – Oatlands Oval.
2000 – Woodsdale 8.13 (61) d Kempton 8.7 (55) – Oatlands Oval.
2001 – Woodsdale 9.12 (66) d Kempton 8.9 (57) – Att: 2,680 at Oatlands Oval.
2002 – Triabunna 12.16 (88) d Bothwell 7.7 (49) – Oatlands Oval.
2003 – Mount Pleasant 12.6 (78) d Woodsdale 9.14 (68) – Oatlands Oval.
2004 – Swansea 11.6 (72) d Triabunna 8.9 (57) – Oatlands Oval.
2005 – Bothwell 7.10 (52) d Mount Pleasant 3.3 (21) – Att: 1,850 at Oatlands Oval.
2006 – Mount Pleasant 8.13 (61) d Swansea 7.6 (48) – Oatlands Oval.
2007 – Swansea 12.6 (78) d Woodsdale 8.10 (58) – Oatlands Oval.
2008 – Woodsdale 9.12 (66) d Swansea 8.3 (51) – Oatlands Oval.
2009 – Woodsdale 11.14 (80) d Campania 7.11 (53) – Oatlands Oval.
2010 – Woodsdale 11.6 (72) d Campania 9.11 (65) – Oatlands Oval
2011 – Mount Pleasant 10.15 (75) d Woodsdale 7.11 (53) – Oatlands Oval
2012 – Woodsdale 18.19 (127) d Mount Pleasant 13.6 (84) – Oatlands Oval
2013 – Mount Pleasant 14.11 (95) d Campania 14.9 (93) – Oatlands Oval
2014 – Mount Pleasant 19.21 (135) d Oatlands 5.7 (37) – Oatlands Oval
2015 – Oatlands 10.12 (72) d Campbell Town 8.12 (60) – Oatlands Oval
2016 – Bothwell 20.10 (130) d Campbell Town 6.12 (48) – Oatlands Oval
2017 – Bothwell 12.7 (79) d Mount Pleasant 5.9 (39) – Oatlands Oval
2018 – Bothwell 14.14 (98) d Campania 9.5 (59) – Oatlands Oval
2019 – Mount Pleasant 12.19 (91) d Campania 6.3 (39) – Oatlands Oval
2020 - 'No Competition due to COVID-19 Pandemic'
2021 - Mount Pleasant 11.12 (78) d Bothwell 11.5 (71) – Oatlands Oval

2016 Ladder

2017 Ladder

2018 Ladder

2019 Ladder

2021 Ladder

Published books
Australian Rules football in Tasmania – John Stoward – 2002, 
More on football – B.T.(Buck) Anderton – Central Coast Courier, 2002,

References

Australian rules football competitions in Tasmania